Martha Wray (1739-1788), was an English businessperson.

She was the niece of the weaver Robert Turlington (1697–1766), who invented and sold the then famous medicine Balsam of Life from 1742.

Upon the death of her uncle, she took over his successful business company, known as Medicinal Warehouse; M. and H. Wray; Messrs. Wray and Co.; Wray's Medicine Warehouse; Wray and Co. Martha Wray.

She was one of the successful 18th-century businesswomen portrayed in the exhibition ‘City Women in the 18th Century’ in London 21 September – 18 October 2019.

References

1739 births
1788 deaths
18th-century English businesspeople
18th-century English businesswomen
18th century in medicine